Abergele Hospital is a community hospital in Abergele, Wales. It is managed by Betsi Cadwaladr University Health Board.

History
The facility was established by Manchester City Council to treat children suffering from tuberculosis in 1910. Originally known as Plas Ucha Sanatorium, expansion took place after a new access bridge was completed in 1925 with a new children's section opening in 1931. It joined the National Health Service in 1948 and was renamed the Abergele Chest Hospital in 1955. It became a community hospital in the 1980s and expanded further when ophthalmology services transferred from the H.M. Stanley Hospital in St Asaph in 2010.

References

NHS hospitals in Wales
Hospital buildings completed in 1910
Hospitals in Conwy County Borough
1910 establishments in Wales
Betsi Cadwaladr University Health Board
Tuberculosis sanatoria in the United Kingdom